Monika Fikerle is an Australian musician and multi-instrumentalist, most noted for her "energetic, quirky" drumming style.

Fikerle began her music career in Hobart in 1995, becoming Sea Scouts' drummer after having taken up the drums 'about a week' earlier. She later played in Surgery and 1001101 before rejoining Sea Scouts in what would become the classic line-up.  Fikerle's drumming style during her early years in Hobart featured a lot of tom work, and used cymbals only to accent the end of the bar, creating a thunderous wall of tribal pounding. Fikerle's later work re-introduced more traditional rock kit elements such as snare and cymbals.

Since relocating to Melbourne, Fikerle has continued to work in more than one band concurrently, including her current projects Love of Diagrams, Baseball and Miniature Submarines, and her previous projects The Bites, The Grimm, and Jihad Against America.  Although Fikerle is best known for her drumming, she has contributed to bands on bass, melodica and piano accordion, and has also featured as a vocalist. Love of Diagrams signed to Matador Records for the release of Mosaic, becoming the first Australian act to appear on the Matador label.

Tours
Fikerle has also toured internationally with several of the bands that she has contributed to, including Sea Scouts, Baseball, and Love of Diagrams.  The tours have encompassed several locations that are not widely visited by Australian bands, such as Eastern Europe and the Middle East.

Discography

On compilations 
Puppet Show, 1998: Sea Scouts – Inbuilt Obsolescence
Make Mix Tapes Not War!, 2003: Love of Diagrams – La Violencia; The Bites – Eno; Baseball – Gods & Stars, Priests & Kings; Jihad Against America – Terrorism Is The New Black
Melbourne Water 2, 2006: Accidents With Magnets – Twig

Videography 
Acting Normal (1997) with "Surgery" (live footage and interview)
Sticky Carpet (2006): with Love of Diagrams (live footage); with Baseball (live footage and interview)
Live at Bar Open (2006): with Baseball (live footage)
The Super8 Diaries Project (2008): with Love of Diagrams (live footage); with Baseball (live footage and interview)

References

External links
 [ Monika Fikerle's listing at allmusic.com]
 Tour news for Baseball
 Love of Diagrams releases
 Larinerg's Sea Scouts site
 Love of Diagrams at Matador Records
 Bassball live review, Brisbane, The Zoo (16 July 2008)
 Love of Diagrams, Mosaic album review

Living people
Musicians from Tasmania
Musicians from Melbourne
Australian rock drummers
1974 births
People from Hobart
Australian indie rock musicians
Australian heavy metal drummers
21st-century drummers
Women in metal
Women in punk